Ricardo Dominic Artadi Roco (born April 12, 1989) is a Filipino actor.

Personal life 
Roco is a son of actor Bembol Roco and the twin brother of actor Felix Roco.

On October 1, 2022, Roco and four other persons were arrested in a buy-bust operation in Quezon City.

Filmography

Television

Films

References

External links

Star Magic personalities
ABS-CBN personalities
GMA Network personalities
Living people
1989 births
Filipino twins
Participants in Philippine reality television series
People from Cebu City
Male actors from Cebu